Constance of Sicily (1324 – 22 October 1355) was a Sicilian princess regent. She ruled the Kingdom of Sicily as regent in the name of her brother, King Louis. She was the daughter of king King Peter II and his wife, Elisabeth of Carinthia.

Life
Her father died in 1342 and her brother Louis succeeded him under the regency of their uncle and, from 1348, their mother. When their mother died in 1352, she succeeded her mother as regent during the minority of her brother. 

Her regency was marked by conflicts between noble factions as well as the black plague. In 1355, Louis died of the black death, shortly followed by her. Her regency had made marriage difficult for her position as regent, and she died unmarried. 

Her position as regent of Sicily was taken over by her sister Euphemia, who kept it until 1357.

Notes

1324 births
1355 deaths
House of Barcelona (Sicily)
Regents of Sicily
14th-century deaths from plague (disease)
14th-century Sicilian people
14th-century women rulers
People of Byzantine descent
14th-century Italian women
Daughters of kings